1987 hurricane season may refer to: 

1987 Atlantic hurricane season
1987 Pacific hurricane season